Novosergeyevka is a rural locality (a selo) and the administrative center of Novosergeyevsky Selsoviet of Seryshevsky District, Amur Oblast, Russia. The population was 462 as of 2018. There are 6 streets.

Geography 
Novosergeyevka is located on the Tom River, 42 km southeast of Seryshevo (the district's administrative centre) by road. Parunovka is the nearest rural locality.

References 

Rural localities in Seryshevsky District